"Members Only" is the 66th episode of the HBO series The Sopranos, and the first of the show's sixth season. Written by Terence Winter and directed by Tim Van Patten, it aired originally on March 12, 2006.

Starring
 James Gandolfini as Tony Soprano
 Lorraine Bracco as Dr. Jennifer Melfi 
 Edie Falco as Carmela Soprano
 Michael Imperioli as Christopher Moltisanti
 Dominic Chianese as Corrado Soprano Jr. 
 Steven Van Zandt as Silvio Dante
 Tony Sirico as Paulie Gualtieri
 Robert Iler as Anthony Soprano Jr. 
 Jamie-Lynn Sigler as Meadow Soprano
 Aida Turturro as Janice Soprano Baccalieri
 Steven R. Schirripa as Bobby Baccalieri
 Vincent Curatola as Johnny Sack 
 Frank Vincent as Phil Leotardo
 John Ventimiglia as Artie Bucco 
 Dan Grimaldi as Patsy Parisi
 Joseph R. Gannascoli as Vito Spatafore
 Toni Kalem as Angie Bonpensiero

Guest starring
 Jerry Adler as Hesh Rabkin

Also guest starring

Synopsis

Nearly two years have passed. Janice is raising a new daughter with Bobby Baccalieri, who has taken up model railroading as a hobby. Meadow continues her relationship with Finn. A.J. is now attending college. Adriana is remembered by a worrying Carmela. Vito is thinner and is now a spokesperson for a weight loss company; he is Tony's best earner and is ambitious. Phil Leotardo, now the acting boss of the Lupertazzi crime family, is taking care of business for the imprisoned Johnny Sack.

In Brooklyn, Hesh Rabkin and his son-in-law Eli Kaplan are assaulted by Lupertazzi associates. Trying to escape, Eli is knocked down by a hit-and-run driver and seriously injured. At Hesh's request, Tony tries to reach out directly to Johnny through his optometrist brother-in-law, Anthony Infante, but Johnny is only paying attention to his immediate family's financial troubles. Tony, Vito, and Christopher, now a capo in the Soprano family, meet with Phil and Gerry "The Hairdo" Torciano. Disputes between Tony and Phil are resolved, and it is explained that the New York associates were protecting Gerry's area and did not know Eli was associated with the Sopranos; they agree to pay Eli $50,000 compensation.

Carmela's construction of her spec house is suspended, due to a "stop order" issued by a building inspector because improper lumber has been used. Her father, Hugh De Angelis, thinks an inspector he used to know would waive the requirement, but his contact has retired. Carmela repeatedly asks Tony to see if he can get the stop order lifted, but he keeps putting it off.

Eugene Pontecorvo inherits $2 million and would like to retire with his family to Florida. Bearing gifts, he goes to Tony to ask permission. Tony reminds Eugene that he took an oath. Later, Eugene gives him a cut of the inheritance. At Chris's behest, he then kills a debtor; in return, Chris says, "I'll put in a good word to T about the Florida thing." Tony's decision is relayed through Silvio: "Your Florida thing. That's a no-go." Eugene is also an informant for the FBI, and has become more valuable to the Bureau since the death of Ray Curto; they, too, will not free him. With his wife bitter and his son using heroin, Eugene hangs himself.

Uncle Junior's mind is deteriorating. Tony helps him look for some money he thinks he buried in his backyard thirty years ago, but they find nothing. Both Dr. Melfi and Janice suggest a retirement home or assisted living for him, but Tony forcefully refuses. One afternoon, Junior is particularly agitated, and Tony goes to his house because no one else is free to look after him. While Tony is cooking dinner, Junior, thinking he is a long-dead mobster, shoots him in the gut. While Junior cowers in a closet upstairs, Tony manages to dial 911 before passing out.

First appearances
The episode marks the first appearances of:
 Agent Ron Goddard: FBI Agent Harris' new partner working counter-terrorism.
 Anthony Infante: Ginny Sacrimoni's brother, who owns an eyewear store. 
 Domenica "Nica" Baccalieri: Janice and Bobby's 12-month-old daughter.
 James "Murmur" Zancone: Christopher's associate and Alcoholics Anonymous sponsor who Christopher says is also good at forging documents.
 Gerry "The Hairdo" Torciano: soldier and acting capo in the Lupertazzi crime family and Phil Leotardo's protégé after his brother's death; responsible for Phil Leotardo's business in Brooklyn following his promotion to acting boss.

Deceased
 Raymond Curto: stroke
 Teddy Spirodakis: shot by Eugene in a diner 
 Eugene Pontecorvo: suicide by hanging
 Dick Barone: (offscreen) owner of Barone Sanitation; died of Amyotrophic lateral sclerosis (Lou Gehrig's disease).

Title reference
 Eugene Pontecorvo is shown wearing a "Members Only" jacket and is made fun of for it by Vito Spatafore.
 It could refer to the Mafia code of being a member-only and never a retiree, just what Eugene Pontecorvo attempted to become.
 Many fans speculate that the title of this episode, and the events that take place within it, foreshadow the true nature of the series finale's ambiguous ending.

Production
 To combat leaked storylines, the writers and Chase used to devise fake scenes to confuse the set. The scene in which Uncle Junior shoots Tony was also shot with Phil Leotardo in a window shooting at Tony instead.
 The "traditional" season premiere sequence involving The Star-Ledger newspaper is not featured. Instead, a montage of the characters is featured showcasing what has happened in the past two years. A new version of the scene with the delivered newspaper appears in the fifth episode of the season, "Mr. & Mrs. John Sacrimoni Request."
 Frank Vincent (Phil Leotardo), Dan Grimaldi (Patsy Parisi), Joseph Gannascoli (Vito Spatafore), and Toni Kalem (Angie Bonpensiero) are promoted to starring cast and are now billed in the opening credits but only for the episodes in which they appear. Of the four, only Frank Vincent is billed in an individual credit; the others are paired (although Dan Grimaldi would be credited individually in the second part of Season 6). 
 Jamie-Lynn Sigler is again billed by her original last name in the opening credits, following her separation from her agent and husband, A.J. DiScala, after Season 5 ended.
 Despite the episode's focus on his character, Robert Funaro (Eugene Pontecorvo) does not appear in the opening credits. Season 3 is the only season in which he does. 
 In the original broadcast of this episode (March 12, 2006), no previews for the next episode were shown in order to keep the aftermath of Tony's shooting a mystery.

References to prior episodes
 Pussy Malanga, the man Uncle Junior was convinced is after him and whom he eventually mistakes Tony for is the same mobster Uncle Junior wanted to kill in Artie Bucco's first restaurant in the pilot episode.
 Dr. Melfi recalls that Tony grabbed a pillow in order to smother his mother in "I Dream of Jeannie Cusamano," but Tony denies this, saying he only grabbed the pillow to occupy his hands.
 Dr. Melfi calls the home that Tony put his mother in a "retirement community" and Tony corrects her and calls it a nursing home. Before this, whenever somebody called it a nursing home, Tony always corrected them and called it a retirement community.

Other cultural references
 Tony refers to his forgetful Uncle Junior as "Knucklehead Smiff."
 Vito asks Agent Harris if he had lost weight due to the Atkins diet.
 When Eugene proposes retiring, he cites the precedent set by "Joe Bananas" (Joseph Bonanno).
 When Eugene's conversation with his wife is interrupted by a call on his cellphone, she says he is responding to "His Master's Voice".
 The movie Junior watches is Paths of Glory, a 1957 war movie directed by Stanley Kubrick.
 When Junior says Pussy Malanga is prank calling his house Tony says they will get FBI director J. Edgar Hoover to investigate.

Music
 The song featured in the opening scene and closing credits is "Seven Souls" by Bill Laswell. It features William S. Burroughs reading from his novel The Western Lands. Creator David Chase describes the song as featuring a strong foreboding tone and themes touching the concepts of death and resurrection. Chase had originally tried to use this song for the pilot episode of The Sopranos. It finally ended up being used on the show in this episode, in the opening montage of the premiere of the final season, eight years later.
 The song featured in the scene where Tony and Carmela are dining at the sushi restaurant is "Ride a White Horse" by Goldfrapp.
 "Dreaming" by Blondie plays on the car radio when Eugene is returning home from his murder job.
 The song playing when Junior shoots Tony is "Comes Love" by Artie Shaw, sung by Helen Forrest.

Awards
 On August 27, 2006, Terence Winter, the episode's writer, won the Primetime Emmy Award for Outstanding Writing for a Drama Series at the 58th Primetime Emmy Awards.

References

External links
"Members Only"  at HBO

The Sopranos (season 6) episodes
2006 American television episodes
Television episodes about suicide
Emmy Award-winning episodes
Television episodes directed by Tim Van Patten
Television episodes written by Terence Winter